Kilian Le Blouch (born 7 October 1989) is a French judoka. He competed at the 2016 Summer Olympics in the men's 66 kg event, in which he was eliminated in the third round by An Baul.

References

External links

 
 
 

1989 births
Living people
French male judoka
Olympic judoka of France
Judoka at the 2016 Summer Olympics
Judoka at the 2019 European Games
European Games medalists in judo
European Games bronze medalists for France
People from Clamart
Judoka at the 2020 Summer Olympics
Medalists at the 2020 Summer Olympics
Olympic medalists in judo
Olympic gold medalists for France
Sportspeople from Hauts-de-Seine
21st-century French people